Paide is an urban municipality of Estonia, in Järva County. It comprises the town of Paide and settlements of former parishes of Paide and Roosna-Alliku.

Settlements
Towns
Paide

Boroughs
Roosna-Alliku

Villages
Allikjärve - Anna - Eivere - Esna - Kaaruka - Kihme - Kirila - Kirisaare - Kodasema - Koordi - Korba - Kriilevälja - Mustla - Mustla-Nõmme - Mäeküla - Mäo - Mündi - Nurme - Nurmsi - Oeti - Ojaküla - Otiku - Pikaküla - Prääma - Puiatu - Purdi - Sargvere - Seinapalu - Sillaotsa - Suurpalu - Sõmeru - Tarbja - Tännapere - Valasti - Valgma - Vedruka - Veskiaru - Viisu - Viraksaare - Võõbu

International relations

Twin towns — sister cities
Paide is twinned with:

 Annaberg-Buchholz, Germany
 Fredensborg, Denmark
 Håbo, Sweden
 Hamina, Finland
 Havířov, Czech Republic
 Jämijärvi, Finland
 Mažeikiai, Lithuania
 Pereiaslav, Ukraine
 Saldus, Latvia
 Westminster, United States

References

External links

Järva County
Municipalities of Estonia